Political Association "Native Fatherland" is a political party of Ukraine that was established in 2010 and headed by Ivan Matiyeshyn.

The party was registered on May 27, 2010.

Its second party congress took place on September 17, 2011. The congress took place in the "Zorianyi" cinema theatre, which is known as a headquarters of the Party of Regions.

Ivan Matiyeshyn was born in the Arkhangelsk Oblast to family of deported Ukrainians. He is the owner of small oil company "Krasnoleninsknaftoghaz".

References

External links
 Party profile at the Center of Political Information
 Party profile at rbc

Political parties in Ukraine
Political parties established in 2010